The name Agriphila inquinatella has been misapplied to some related species in the past; see below for details.

Agriphila inquinatella is a small moth species of the family Crambidae. It is found in Europe, around the Caucasus area to Turkestan, and in the Near East to Jordan. The type locality is in Austria.

Three subspecies are accepted today:
 Agriphila inquinatella inquinatella (Denis & Schiffermüller, 1775) – most of the range
 Agriphila inquinatella nevadensis (Caradja, 1910) – Sierra Nevada and presumably elsewhere in Spain
 Agriphila inquinatella elbursella (Zerny, 1939) – Alborz mountains and presumably elsewhere in the Caucasus region

The adult moths fly between June and September, depending on the location. Their wingspan is 23–29 mm.

The caterpillars feed mainly on Poaceae grasses, such as meadow-grass species (Poa) or sheep's fescue (Festuca ovina). They can be found under pebbles adjacent to their food plants, suggesting that they feed on the plants' roots. A more unusual food plant is the Pottiales moss Tortula muralis.

Misidentifications involving this species
Apart from the junior synonyms listed, two scientific names have been misapplied to this species in the past:
 Crambus luteellus, used by James Francis Stephens in 1834, William Wood in 1839, and Stanisław Błeszyński in 1955 – actually a junior synonym of Pediasia luteella
 Palparia rorea, used by Adrian Hardy Haworth in 1811 – actually a lapsus for Palparia rorella, junior synonym of Chrysocrambus craterellus craterellus

In turn, the present species' scientific name was erroneously used for the related moths Pediasia contaminella (by  Jacob Hübner in 1817), Agriphila geniculea (by J.F. Stephens in 1834 and W. Wood in 1839), Pediasia aridella (by Philipp Christoph Zeller in 1839), and Agriphila brioniella (by Aristide Caradja in 1910 and Alexander Kirilow Drenowski in 1923).

Footnotes

References
  (1942): Eigenartige Geschmacksrichtungen bei Kleinschmetterlingsraupen ["Strange tastes among micromoth caterpillars"]. Zeitschrift des Wiener Entomologen-Vereins 27: 105-109 [in German]. PDF fulltext
  Archived here. April 15, 2007.

External links

 waarneming.nl 
 Lepidoptera of Belgium
 Agriphila inquinatella. UKMoths.

Crambini
Moths described in 1775
Moths of Asia
Moths of Europe
Taxa named by Michael Denis
Taxa named by Ignaz Schiffermüller